Lembá is a district of São Tomé and Príncipe, on São Tomé Island. The district seat is Neves. It is divided into the two statistical subdistricts Neves and Santa Catarina.

Geography
Much of the district lies within Parque Natural Obô de São Tomé. The district has the nation's highest point, Pico de São Tomé. The river Xufexufe flows through the district. A few islets are adjacent to the island coast including Gabado and Ilhéu de São Miguel.

Population

Settlements
The main settlement is the town Neves. Other settlements are:

Diogo Vaz
Generosa
Lembá
Monte Forte
Ponta Figo 
Praia de Ponta Figo
Ribeira Funda
Rosema
Santa Catarina
São José

Politics
Lembá currently has six seats in the National Assembly.

Twin towns - sister cities
Lembá District is twinned with:
Crato, Portugal
Santa Marta de Penaguião, Portugal

References

External links

 
Districts of São Tomé and Príncipe
São Tomé Island